Alavi Culture and Technology Centre ( – Kesht va Şanʿat ʿAlavī) is a village and culture and technology centre in Hakimabad Rural District, in the Central District of Zarandieh County, Markazi Province, Iran. At the 2006 census, its population was 27, in 6 families.

References 

Populated places in Zarandieh County